Jukka Piirainen (born 1 April 1969) is a Finnish sailor. He competed in the 49er event at the 2004 Summer Olympics.

References

External links
 

1969 births
Living people
Finnish male sailors (sport)
Olympic sailors of Finland
Sailors at the 2004 Summer Olympics – 49er
People from Kuopio
Sportspeople from North Savo
20th-century Finnish people